Dugesia is a genus of flowering plants in the family Asteraceae.

There is only one known species, Dugesia mexicana, endemic to Mexico (Hidalgo, México State, Puebla, Veracruz, Tlaxcala)

References 

Heliantheae
Endemic flora of Mexico